Karim Walid Sayed Saleh Hassan (born 8 August 1997) commonly known as Nedvěd is an Egyptian professional footballer who plays as a winger for Future on loan from Al Ahly and the Egypt U-20. He is a product of Al Ahly youth academy. He got his nickname in the youth team as his position and looks were similar to the Czech legend Pavel Nedvěd.

Career statistics 
'' Last updated on 3 July 2018

With clubs

Honours and achievements

Club
Al Ahly
 Egyptian Premier League:  2016–17, 2017–18, 2018–19
 Egypt Cup: 2017
 Egyptian Super Cup: 2017

References

1997 births
Egyptian footballers
Al Ahly SC players
Living people
2015 Africa U-23 Cup of Nations players
Egyptian Premier League players
Egypt international footballers
Footballers from Cairo
Association football forwards
Association football midfielders
Future FC (Egypt) players